Nelson Edward Toburen (born November 24, 1938) is a former American football linebacker in the National Football League for the Green Bay Packers.   A serious neck injury in his second season ended his NFL career; he attended law school and eventually became a judge.

Early years
Born in Boulder, Colorado, Toburen played high school football in Kansas at Colby High School and college football at Wichita State University as an end.

Playing career
Toburen was selected in the fourteenth round (194th overall) of the 1961 NFL draft by the Green Bay Packers. It was the third season under head coach Vince Lombardi and the Packers won the NFL championship, their first since 1944. As a rookie, Toburen was a reserve linebacker, playing mostly on special teams.

Only start
In 1962, Toburen was a second-year linebacker when he made his first NFL start, replacing the injured Dan Currie on November 18 at City Stadium in Green Bay. The Packers had won all nine games and the opponent was the Western Conference rival Baltimore Colts, led by star quarterback Johnny Unitas.  The Packers were leading 17–13 early in the fourth quarter when, "Unitas went back to pass and then started to run," Toburen said. "(Ray) Nitschke was coming at him straight on and I was coming from the side.

"I hit him squarely in the hip, but the mechanics of the tackle got blown up. My head was down and it should have been up." Toburen's hit jarred the ball loose from Unitas and Nitschke recovered the fumble. But Toburen lay still on the City Stadium turf. "With my first start, my emotions were high, and I was playing reckless that day," Toburen said. "It was the greatest thing with my first start in front of my wife and dad. One moment I was on top of the world and then I wasn't."

Before Toburen even hit the ground, James Nellen, the team physician, was off the Packer bench and running onto the field to assist. "Doc Nellen realized right away what had happened - Nelson had broken his neck," said former guard Jerry Kramer. "According to Kramer, Nellen put pressure on Toburen's neck as they put him on a cart, moved him off the field, loaded him in the ambulance, wheeled him into the hospital and took him up to his room where they put him into traction.

Nellen's quick actions to stabilize Toburen's head and neck were instrumental to a successful outcome. "Nellen was wringing wet and shaking after that, but he made the difference," Kramer said. "He preserved Nelson's functions and maybe his life."

The ,  Toburen said it was a tackle that he had made more than 1,000 times in his football career, but he immediately knew something was wrong, very wrong. "I was aware of things and just knew that it felt like my arms were on fire," Toburen said. "Doc Nellen saved my bacon. He realized what was wrong and he didn't let me get up."

Toburen, whose sixth vertebrae broke in half and fifth was displaced, was fortunate that his spinal cord was stretched, not severed. At St. Vincent's Hospital, he was put in a body cast for the next six weeks. With Currie and Toburen out, backup center Ken Iman played linebacker and started the next game four days later on Thanksgiving in Detroit against the Lions (8–2).

"I tell people I broke my damn neck, but I had to be dramatic and do it against a hall of fame quarterback like Johnny Unitas," Toburen said with a laugh. "But I accomplished everything I set out to do on the play - make the tackle and cause a fumble. "Most important, we won the game. The next week we lost our only game at Detroit, and I always told my teammates it was because I wasn't there." But for Toburen, his first start in a Green Bay uniform also was his last.

After football
Nelson obtained his law degree from Washburn University's School of Law in Topeka in 1967, and became a judge in Crawford County, Kansas, in 1987.

His son Chris was a standout linebacker at the University of Kansas and became a helicopter pilot in the U.S. Marine Corps. He was killed at age 27 in a training mission crash of his CH-46 in California in 1987.

References

External links
 
 Judge Nelson Toburen

1938 births
Living people
Sportspeople from Boulder, Colorado
American football linebackers
Green Bay Packers players
Players of American football from Colorado